Sonya M. Savage  is a Canadian politician who served as the minister of energy for Alberta from April 20, 2019 to October, 2022. She was then appointed as Minister of Environment and Protected Areas on October 21, 2022. A member of the United Conservative Party (UCP), she was elected following the 2019 Alberta general election to represent Calgary-North West in the Legislative Assembly of Alberta. Savage has also acted as the minister of justice and solicitor general of Alberta from January 18, 2022 to February 25, 2022, while incumbent minister Kaycee Madu underwent a probe into his conduct.

Political career 
Savage was elected following the 2019 Alberta general election to represent Calgary-North West.

Minister of Energy 
Savage, whose background in energy and the environment includes major projects, such as the Enbridge Northern Gateway Pipelines and with her work as an executive of Canadian Energy Pipeline Association (CEPA), was appointed Minister of Energy on April 30, 2019. She is tasked with overhauling the Alberta Energy Regulator (AER)—one of the UCP's campaign promises with the aim of implementing "shorter timelines for project approvals."  She was also involved in "CEPA's examination of Bill C-69, Ottawa's overhaul of how major energy projects — including oil and gas pipelines — are reviewed by the federal government."

In February 2019, the previous government signed a crude-by-rail program agreement with two railway companies—and the Canadian Pacific Railway (CPR) Canadian National Railway (CNR) with a goal of reducing the Western Canadian Select price discount that has been exacerbated by the "lack of pipeline capacity". Through the four-year, $3.7-billion agreement the "province would have purchased and shipped 120,000 barrels of crude a day." The New Democratic Party (NDP) government had estimated that the program would have generated "revenue of $6-billion", according to The Globe and Mail. The Kenney government cancelled the agreement shortly after taking office because the "financial risks were too high".

In the first year as minister Savage negotiated with Canadian Pacific Railway (CPR) Canadian National Railway (CNR) to cancel the crude-by-rail program agreement signed by the Premier Rachel Notley.

In a May 20 interview on the Canadian Association of Oilwell Drilling Contractors (CAODC) podcast, Minister Savage told the podcast host, John Bavil, that Green party leader, Elizabeth May's May 6 comment that "oil is dead" was not "gaining resonance with ordinary Canadians" because Canadians need oil. "Canadians are just trying to get by." Savage added that Canadians were "not going to have tolerance and patience for protests that get in the way of people working", and that the "economic turmoil caused by the COVID-19 pandemic favours pipeline construction", according to Canadian Press journalist, Bob Weber. Savage told Bavil that "Now is a great time to be building a pipeline because you can't have protests of more than 15 people...Let's get it built." The comment received wide media coverage.

On January 18, 2022, Premier Jason Kenney announced that Savage would serve as acting minister of justice pending the conclusion of a probe into the incumbent minister Kaycee Madu's behaviour following a traffic stop.

Electoral record

References

United Conservative Party MLAs
Living people
Women MLAs in Alberta
21st-century Canadian politicians
Members of the Executive Council of Alberta
Women government ministers of Canada
21st-century Canadian women politicians
1967 births